Pseudeos is a genus of parrot in the family Psittaculidae.

Taxonomy

There are two species:.

References

 
Taxonomy articles created by Polbot